II: Crush the Insects is the second album by the Finnish doom metal band Reverend Bizarre, released in 2005. The song "Slave of Satan", which was released as a single on 20 April of that year, appears here in a 13:27 version, which is an abridgement compared to the full version of the song released as a CD single which clocked at 20:59. Due to the more upbeat nature of the first part of the album, the CD case has a sticker accusing Reverend Bizarre of being "The Biggest Sell-Out in True Doom".

Track listing

Personnel

Reverend Bizarre
 Albert Witchfinder – bass and vocals, choir on track 1
 Peter Vicar – guitar, choir on track 1
 Earl of Void – guitar and drums, choir on track 1

Additional Personnel 
 Anton "Satan's Claw" Q-Pias – guest guitar solos on the tracks "Fucking Wizard" and "By This Axe I Rule"
 Daniel Nyman: choir on track 1

References 

2005 albums
Reverend Bizarre albums
Season of Mist albums